Spacewoman or Space women or variation may refer to:

 Astronaut or cosmonaut who is female, a woman trained to operate or serve aboard a spacecraft
 Women in space
 List of female astronauts
 Female taikonaut
 Female cosmonaut
 Spacewoman (1998 album) an album by Selina Martin produced by Bob Wiseman
 The Spacewomen, superhero characters from the 1980 kaiju film Gamera: Super Monster

See also
 Women in space
 Memoirs of a Spacewoman (1962 novel) science fiction novel by Naomi Mitchison
 Women in space (disambiguation)
 Spaceman (disambiguation)